Zely Pierre Inzoungou-Massanga is a Congolese politician. He served as Representative of the Chairman and Deputy Chairperson of the Committee on Rules, Privileges and Discipline while a member of the Pan-African Parliament. He also occupied the Niari Department spot in the Republic of Congo Senate for the Action and Renewal Movement.

References

Living people
Year of birth missing (living people)
Republic of the Congo politicians